Hoërskool Velddrif [Velddrif High School] is a public high school in Velddrif, Western Cape, South Africa. It is an Afrikaans combined upper and lower secondary school with approximately 500 students.

History
Hoërskool Velddrif was founded in 1890 as a private school.

 List of school principals

Crest 
The school crest represents the environs of Velddrif. Five wavy white lanes represent water, namely the Berg River and the sea. The boat is a stylized version of a fishing boat, honoring Velddrif's fishing industry, on which the town's economy was largely built. The bridge indicates the bridge between youth and adulthood. The sun relates to the schools motto: "Strive Higher."

Educational institutions established in 1980
High schools in South Africa
Bilingual schools in South Africa
West Coast District Municipality